Alfayaya Embalo (born 20 March 1977) is a Cape Verdean sprinter.

Embalo qualified for the men's 100 metres at the 1996 Summer Olympics in Atlanta, but did not start in the race. The following year in a meet in Barcelona, Spain, Embalo run the 200 metres in 22.04 seconds, a Cape Verdean record which still stands today.

References

Living people
Cape Verdean male sprinters
Olympic athletes of Cape Verde
Athletes (track and field) at the 1996 Summer Olympics
1977 births
Place of birth missing (living people)